Constrained equal losses (CEL) is a division rule for solving bankruptcy problems. According to this rule, each claimant should lose an equal amount from his or her claim, except that no claimant should receive a negative amount. In the context of taxation, it is known as poll tax.

Formal definition 
There are n claimants. Usually, that is, the estate is insufficient to satisfy all the claims.

The CEL rule says that each claimant i should receive , where r is a constant chosen such that .  The rule can also be described algorithmically as follows: 

 Initially, all agents are active, and each agent gets his full claim. 
 While the total allocation is larger than the estate: 
 Remove one unit equally from all active agents.
 Each agent whose total allocation drops to zero becomes inactive.

Examples 
Examples with two claimants:

 ; here .
 ; here  too.
 ;  here .

Examples with three claimants:

 ; here .
 ; here .
 ; here .

Usage 
In the Jewish law, if several bidders participate in an auction and then revoke their bids simultaneously, they have to compensate the seller for the loss. The loss is divided among the bidders according to the CEL rule.
If the first bidder says: "I will [redeem] it for ten selaim," the second: "...for twenty," and a third "...for 24," and the second and third bidders retract at the same time, we enable the first to redeem it for 10, and we expropriate 7 from the property of both the second and the third. Thus, the Temple treasury collects 24. Similarly, if all three of them retract and the consecrated article is [ultimately] sold for 3, we expropriate 7 selaim from the property of all of them.

Characterizations 
The CEL rule has several characterizations. It is the only rule satisfying the following sets of axioms:

 Equal treatment of equals, minimal rights first, and composition down;
 Conditional null compensation, and composition up;
 Conditional null compensation, and the dual of claims-monotonicity.

Dual rule 
The constrained equal awards (CEA) rule is the dual of the CEL rule, that is: for each problem , we have .

References 

Bankruptcy theory